The Movie Album is an album by pianist Ramsey Lewis featuring theme music from several motion pictures which was recorded in 1966 and released on the Cadet label.

Reception

Allmusic awarded the album 2 stars.

Track listing
 "Theme from The Pawnbroker" (Quincy Jones) - 2:25   
 "Saturday Night After the Movies" (Richard Evans) - 2:55   
 "The Gentle Rain" (Luiz Bonfá) - 3:28   
 "China Gate" (Harold Adamson, Victor Young) - 2:43   
 "Emily" (Johnny Mandel, Johnny Mercer) - 2:57   
 "Goin' Hollywood" (Evans) - 3:30   
 "From Russia With Love" (Lionel Bart) - 2:39   
 "The Shadow of Your Smile" (Mandel, Paul Francis Webster) - 3:52   
 "Girl Talk" (Bobby Troup, Neil Hefti) - 3:25   
 "Matchmaker, Matchmaker" (Jerry Bock, Sheldon Harnick) - 3:01   
 "Return to Paradise" (Dimitri Tiomkin, Ned Washington) - 2:56

Personnel 
Ramsey Lewis - piano
Cleveland Eaton - bass
Maurice White  - drums
Orchestra and voices arranged and conducted by Richard Evans

References 

1966 albums
Ramsey Lewis albums
Cadet Records albums
Albums produced by Esmond Edwards